Masinagudi is a village in the Nilgiris District of the state of Tamil Nadu in India. It is in the buffer zone of the Mudumalai National Park. Masinagudi has several schools and other amenities and a number of resorts.

Geography
Masinagudi is a village on the Sigur Plateau. It is located on MDR700 between Ooty and Theppakadu in the Nilgiris district of Tamil Nadu, India. The village is in the buffer zone of the Mudumalai Tiger Reserve, just outside the Mudumalai National Park.

Climate
When compared with winter, the summers have much more rainfall. This location is classified as Aw by Köppen and Geiger. In Masinagudi, the average annual temperature is 22 °C. In a year, the rainfall is 1514 mm.

Demographics
The population as of the 2011 Census was 8,783 with 2,393 households.  The gender ratio was 1,021 females per 1,000 males.  The percentages of Scheduled Castes is 25.9% and of Scheduled Tribes is 20.5%.  The literacy rate is 67.9%, with males at 74.1% and females 61.9%.

Amenities
Masinagudi is governed by a Gram Panchayat.  It has a number of schools.  As of 2011, there were 8 pre-primary schools, 5 primary schools, 3 middle and secondary schools, and 1 senior secondary school.  Masinagudi and 10 surrounding sub-villages are served by the India Posts Sub Post Office, Masinagudi with PIN code 643223.

See also
Mudumalai National Park

References

Villages in Nilgiris district